A leadership election was held for the Social Democratic and Labour Party of Northern Ireland between 12 and 15 November 2015. The result was a victory for Colum Eastwood.

Background
Following poor election results in the 2014 local elections, the 2014 European Parliament election and the 2015 Westminster election, McDonnell resisted calls to stand down. Initially no challenger came forward, though early in June it was rumoured that eventual challenger Colum Eastwood would stand. It was not until late September that Eastwood confirmed that he would stand against McDonnell.

Candidates
Two SDLP members announced they would stand in the leadership election. These were:
Colum Eastwood - MLA for Foyle. At 32 years old, Eastwood is the youngest SDLP MLA. He counted among his supporters the former Deputy First Minister of Northern Ireland Seamus Mallon and former leader Mark Durkan.
Alasdair McDonnell - Leader of the SDLP and MP for Belfast South.

Results
Below is a table summarising the results of the leadership election. With just two candidates there was only one round of votes.

References

Social Democratic and Labour Party leadership elections
Social Democratic and Labour Party leadership
Social Democratic and Labour Party leadership election